The 1984 NCAA Division III Lacrosse Championship was the fifth annual tournament to determine the national champions of NCAA Division III men's college lacrosse in the United States.

The tournament field included eight teams, with the final played at Boswell Field at the Hobart and William Smith Colleges in Geneva, New York. 

Hosts and four-time defending champions Hobart defeated Washington College in the final, 12–5, to win their fifth Division III national title.

Bracket

See also
1984 NCAA Division I Men's Lacrosse Championship
1984 NCAA Women's Lacrosse Championship

References

NCAA Division III Men's Lacrosse Championship
NCAA Division III Men's Lacrosse Championship
NCAA Division III Men's Lacrosse